Silvia Albrecht (born 25 February 1971) is a Swiss badminton player. She competed in women's singles and women's doubles at the 1992 Summer Olympics in Barcelona.

References

External links

1971 births
Living people
Swiss female badminton players
Olympic badminton players of Switzerland
Badminton players at the 1992 Summer Olympics